Mihály Sasvári (born 1932) is a Hungarian sprint canoer who competed in the early 1950s. He won two medals at the 1954 ICF Canoe Sprint World Championships in Mâcon with a silver in the C-2 10000 m and a bronze in the C-2 1000 m events.

References

Hungarian male canoeists
Living people
1932 births
ICF Canoe Sprint World Championships medalists in Canadian
20th-century Hungarian people